Susan Tegg (born 15 September 1975) is an Australian sprint canoeist who competed in the mid-2000s. At the 2004 Summer Olympics, she was eliminated in the semifinals of the K-2 500 m event.

References
Sports-Reference.com profile

1975 births
Australian female canoeists
Canoeists at the 2004 Summer Olympics
Living people
Olympic canoeists of Australia